The 1959 Ohio Bobcats football team was an American football team that represented Ohio University in the Mid-American Conference (MAC) during the 1959 NCAA University Division football season. In their second season under head coach Bill Hess, the Bobcats compiled a 7–2 record (4–2 against MAC opponents), finished in second place in the MAC, and outscored all opponents by a combined total of 215 to 101.  They played their home games in Peden Stadium in Athens, Ohio.

Schedule

References

Ohio
Ohio Bobcats football seasons
Ohio Bobcats football